Roleplayer is a role-playing game published by Roleplayer Enterprises in 1983.

Description
Roleplayer is a universal role-playing system, and includes rules for using the game with medieval fantasy, mutant powers, modern horror, and future technology.

Publication history
Roleplayer was designed by Matthew P. King, and published by Roleplayer Enterprises in 1983. It is a 187-page 3 hole-punched looseleaf book.

Reception

References

Role-playing games introduced in 1983
Universal role-playing games